Christian Blangstrup (29 October 1857, Nykøbing Falster – 1926) was a Danish encyclopedist. Born in Nykjobing, he was editor-in-chief of the Danish newspaper Berlingske Tidende from 1902 to 1912. He later edited the volumes 1–21 of the second edition of the Danish encyclopedia Salmonsens Konversationsleksikon.

References

1857 births
1926 deaths
People from Guldborgsund Municipality
Danish editors
19th-century Danish journalists
20th-century Danish journalists